The 1925 Ripon by-election was a parliamentary by-election held on 5 December 1925 for the British House of Commons constituency of Ripon.

Vacancy 
The by-election was a consequence of the sitting MP Edward Wood – later the 3rd Viscount Halifax and the 1st Earl of Halifax – being elevated to the peerage as Baron Irwin in order to serve as Viceroy of India.

Election history
Wood had served Ripon as a Conservative since 1910. At every election since 1918, Wood was returned unopposed.

Candidates 
Two candidates were nominated. The Conservative candidate was the John Waller Hills, who had represented the City of Durham until he was defeated in the 1922 general election. He was opposed in the by-election by the Liberal candidate John Murray, another former MP who had lost his seat in the 1923 general election in Leeds West. Murray had subsequently fought unsuccessfully in the Kirkcaldy Burghs constituency in the 1924 general election. There was no Labour candidate.

Main issues and campaign
During the campaign Murray openly disagreed with his own leader Lloyd George's plans for nationalization of land and the coal industry.

Result 
The Conservatives held the seat;

Aftermath 
After his defeat, Murray did not stand for parliament again while Hills sought to defend Ripon at the General election.
The result at the following General election;

Hills was to remain MP for Ripon until his death in 1939.

External links

 Results
 Announcement of candidates

Ripon by-election
Ripon by-election
1920s in Yorkshire
Ripon by-election
History of Ripon
By-elections to the Parliament of the United Kingdom in North Yorkshire constituencies
Politics of the Borough of Harrogate
Politics of Ripon